Scoliopus hallii, the Oregon fetid adderstongue,  is a plant species endemic to western Oregon. It is closely related to the California fetid adderstongue, Scoliopus bigelovii, but has yellow flowers with thin purple stripes rather than the purple flowers with yellow stripes as in S. bigelovii

References

Liliaceae
Flora of Oregon
Plants described in 1879
Flora without expected TNC conservation status